George Wharton James (27 September 1858 – 8 November 1923) was an American popular lecturer, photographer, journalist and editor. Born in Lincolnshire, England, he emigrated to the United States as a young man after being ordained as a Methodist minister.

He served in parishes in Nevada and Southern California, gradually beginning his journalism and writing career. An editor of two magazines, he also wrote more than 40 books and many articles and pamphlets on California and the American Southwest.

Biography
George Wharton James was born in Lincolnshire, England. He married and was ordained as a Methodist minister. He and his wife immigrated to the United States in 1881.

He served in parishes in Nevada and southern California. However, in 1889 his wife sued for divorce, accusing him of committing numerous acts of adultery. He was tried by the Methodist Church, charged with real estate fraud, using faked credentials, and sexual misconduct. He was defrocked, although he was later reinstated.

In addition to writing his own books, James was associate editor of The Craftsman (1904–05), and editor of Out West (1912–14). In the style of the times, he was a popular lecturer in the region. He also lectured at both the Panama-Pacific and Panama-California expositions 1915–16.

James had a long-running feud with Charles Fletcher Lummis, a California writer with similar regional interests. Both men also explored the American Southwest, becoming acquainted with Father Anton Docher, a French-born missionary priest who served at Pueblo of Isleta in New Mexico for 34 years.

James's books included the well-received The Wonders of the Colorado Desert (1906), Through Ramona's Country (1909), In and Out of the Old Missions of California (1905), and The Lake of the Sky (1915). Characteristics of his writing included romanticism, an enthusiasm for natural environments, the idealization of aboriginal lifeways, and the promotion of health fads.

After his divorce, James married again, living in Pasadena, California with his second wife at 1098 North Raymond Avenue.  Writer Lawrence Clark Powell later described James's home as serving as "a kind of museum salon in the same way that El Alisal served as the center for his rival booster Lummis' Los Angeles followers. He founded the Pasadena Browning Society and the Anti-Whispering Society. According to Powell, the Anti-Whispering Society was "devoted to the suppression of (1) talking audiences, (2) peanut fiends, and (3) crying babies."

James was an advocate of outdoor nakedness or nudism.

Honors
His books and pamphlets were collected by the California State Library and the University of California, Berkeley. 
A collection of his photographs is on file at the University of New Mexico. 
The Southwest Museum in Los Angeles has some of his papers and photographs.

Bibliography

   (with illustrations by Carl Eytel)

Notes

References

 Bourdon, Roger Joseph (1966). George Wharton James, Interpreter of the Southwest. Los Angeles, CA: University of California, Los Angeles. Ph.D. thesis. pp. 375. 
 
  
 Starr, Kevin (1973 and 1986). Americans and the California Dream, 1850–1915. New York, NY: Oxford University Press. pp. 494.  (1986)

External links

 
 
 
 
 
 "Basket Makers," Sunset 8(1) (1901)
 "A Saboba Origin-Myth" (1902)
 "The Legend of Tauquich and Algoot" (1903)
  (1910)
  (1913)
 

American nature writers
American non-fiction outdoors writers
American travel writers
American male non-fiction writers
Writers from California
1858 births
1923 deaths
American naturists
Social nudity advocates